Yanam Venkanna Babu Brahmōtsavām is an annual festival at Yanam Venkanna Babu Temple celebrated in the month of Kārtika (September/October), since 2003.  Each day, during dusk, the Lord's chariot procession occurs on streets with different chariots.

Sesha Vāhanam
On the first day of the festival, vāhanam of the day will be Sesha Vāhanam (శేష వాహనము), i.e., The Serpent Chariot.The Sponsor of the day (ఉత్సవ నిర్వాహకులు) will be Sri Gurudatta Brahmana Seva Samiti.

Hamsa Vāhanam
On the second day of the festival, vāhanam of the day will be Hamsa Vāhanam (హంస  వాహనము), i.e., The Swan Chariot. The Sponsor of the day (ఉత్సవ నిర్వాహకులు) will be Kapu Utsava Committee.

Hanumanta Vāhanam
On the third day of the festival, vāhanam of the day will be Hanumanta Vāhanam (హనుమంత వాహనము), i.e., The Hanuman Chariot. The Sponsor of the day (ఉత్సవ నిర్వాహకులు) will be Kakatiya Kamma Sangham.

Simha Vāhanam
On the fourth day of the festival, vāhanam of the day will be Simha Vāhanam (సింహ వాహనము), i.e., The Lion Chariot. The Sponsor of the day (ఉత్సవ నిర్వాహకులు) will be Sri Rajaka Sangham.

Garuda Vāhanam
On the fifth day of the festival, vāhanam of the day will be Garuda Vāhanam (గరుడ  వాహనము), i.e., The Eagle Chariot. The Sponsor of the day (ఉత్సవ నిర్వాహకులు) will be Sri Vasavi Kanyaka Parameswari Aryavaisya Sangham.

Gaja Vāhanam
On the sixth day of the festival, vāhanam of the day will be Gaja Vāhanam (గజ  వాహనము), i.e., The Elephant Chariot. The Sponsor of the day (ఉత్సవ నిర్వాహకులు) will be Adi Andhra Sankshema Sangham.

Aśva Vāhanam
On the seventh day of the festival, vāhanam of the day will be Aśva Vāhanam (అశ్వ  వాహనము), i.e., The Horse Chariot. The Sponsor of the day (ఉత్సవ నిర్వాహకులు) will be Yanam Kshatriya Parishat.

Pushpaka Vāhanam
On the eighth day of the festival, vāhanam of the day will be Pushpaka Vāhanam (పుష్పక వాహనము), i.e., The Elephant Chariot. The Sponsor of the day (ఉత్సవ నిర్వాహకులు) will be Sri Krishna Chaitanya Yadava Sangham.

Rathōstavam
On the ninth day of the festival there will be Rathōstavam (రథోత్సవం), i.e., The Chariot Festival. The Sponsor of the day (ఉత్సవ నిర్వాహకులు) will be Sri Agnikula Kshatriya Sankshema Seva Sangham.

Teppōstavam
On the tenth day of the festival there will be Teppōstavam (తెప్పోత్సవం), i.e., The Boat Festival. The Sponsor of the day (ఉత్సవ నిర్వాహకులు) will be Sri Agnikula Kshatriya Sankshema Seva Sangham.

See also
Yanam Śrī Rājarājeśwara Kalyāṇōtsavam
Yanam Venkanna Babu Kalyāṇōtsavam

References

Yanam
Hindu festivals
Festivals in Andhra Pradesh
Festivals in Puducherry
Religious festivals in India